This list of the tallest buildings in Pennsylvania includes all skyscrapers  or taller, ranked by height. It is currently the 9th-tallest building in the United States.

Tallest buildings

The tallest building in Reading is the Berks County Courthouse, rising .

Timeline of tallest buildings

See also 

List of tallest buildings in Philadelphia
List of tallest buildings in Pittsburgh

References

Pennsylvania
Tallest